Jane Simpson may refer to:

Jane Simpson (artist) (born 1965), English artist
Jane Simpson (footballer) (born 1971), New Zealand international women's football (soccer) player
Jane Simpson (linguist), Australian linguist
Jane Simpson (solicitor), English lawyer
Jane Cross Simpson (1811–1886), Scottish hymnist and poet
Jane Simpson (engineer), British engineer
Jane Simpson McKimmon (1867–1957), author, agricultural educator, civic leader and a director of women's institutes